A rotary compression pump works in cycles. Over each cycle a volume is created in contact with the chamber where pressure is to be lowered. By random motion, molecules from the vacuum chamber pass into the volume created by the pump. This volume is then cut off from the chamber and compressed in contact with a one way valve. If the volume is compressed enough some of the molecules will pass through the valve.

Performance
The maximum efficiency of a rotary compression pump is the ratio between the volume in contact with the vacuum and the smallest contracted volume in contact with the valve. If the ratio is 1:1000 and the pump is exhausting to atmospheric pressure, the highest achievable vacuum is 1/1000 of atmospheric pressure. This corresponds to 0.76 Torr or 101.3 Pa. This limitation makes rotary compression pumps very hard to construct if lower pressures than about 1 Torr is to be achieved. The simplicity of the process makes the rotary compression pump cheap and it is widely used as a low vacuum pump, or a backing pump to a diffusion pump or turbomolecular pump.

See also
 Rotary vane pump

References

Pumps